11 teams took part in the league with FC Spartak Moscow winning the championship.

League standings

Results

Top scorers
14 goals
 Nikita Simonyan (Spartak Moscow)
 Avtandil Gogoberidze (Dinamo Tbilisi)

9 goals
 Vitali Vatskevich (Torpedo Moscow)

8 goals
 Georgi Borzenko (Lokomotiv Kharkov)
 Pyotr Katrovsky (Zenit Leningrad)
 Boris Tatushin (Spartak Moscow)

7 goals
 Aleksandr Gulevsky (Zenit Kuybyshev)
 Zaur Kaloyev (Dinamo Tbilisi)
 Mykhaylo Koman (Dynamo Kiev)
 Vladimir Savdunin (Dynamo Moscow)

References

 Soviet Union - List of final tables (RSSSF)
 Season regulations. football.lg.ua

1949
1
Soviet
Soviet